The North American Industry Classification System or NAICS is a classification of business establishments by type of economic activity (the process of production). It is used by government and business in Canada, Mexico, and the United States of America.  It has largely replaced the older Standard Industrial Classification (SIC) system, except in some government agencies, such as the U.S. Securities and Exchange Commission (SEC).

An establishment is typically a single physical location, though administratively distinct operations at a single location may be treated as separate establishments.  Each establishment is classified as an industry according to the primary business activity taking place there.  NAICS does not offer guidance on organizing enterprises (companies) composed of multiple establishments.

Codes

The NAICS numbering system employs a five or six-digit code at the most detailed industry level. The first five digits are generally (although not always strictly) the same in all three countries. The first two digits designate the largest business sector; the third digit represents the subsector; the fourth digit represents the industry group; the fifth digit designates the NAICS industries, and the sixth digit represents the national industries.

History

NAICS is a collaborative effort by Mexico's Instituto Nacional de Estadística y Geografía (INEGI), Statistics Canada, and the United States Office of Management and Budget (OMB), through its Economic Classification Policy Committee (ECPC), staffed by the Bureau of Economic Analysis (BEA), the Bureau of Labor Statistics (BLS), and the Census Bureau. The system is designed to be largely compatible with the United Nations Statistical Office's International Standard Industrial Classification system (ISIC).  NAICS versions are released every five years.

With the first version, released in 1997, NAICS offered enhanced service sector coverage relative to the SIC. The 2002 revision accommodated significant changes in the Information Sector.  The 2012 revision slightly reduced the number of industries and modified six sectors.

NAICS changes/updation are done at intervals of five years; the latest NAICS updated in 2022.

See also
 International Standard Industrial Classification
 Standard Industrial Classification (SIC)
 North American Product Classification System (NAPCS)
 Global Industry Classification Standard
 Statistical Classification of Economic Activities in the European Community
 Thomson Reuters Business Classification

Notes

References

Further reading

External links
 Trilateral NAICS site
 United States Census NAICS
 Statistics Canada NAICS
 Mexico SCIAN
 Historical NAICS changes

Analogues in other countries
 Russian Economic Activities Classification System (OKVED) 
 Standard Industrial Classification (South Africa)

1997 establishments in the United States
Industry classifications
Trilateral relations of Canada, Mexico, and the United States
Statistics Canada
United States Office of Management and Budget